HNLMS Piet Hein (F811) was a frigate of the . The ship was in service with the Royal Netherlands Navy from 1981 to 1998. The frigate was named after Dutch naval hero Piet Pieterszoon Hein. The ship's radio call sign was "PAVM".

Dutch service history
HNLMS Piet Hein was built at KM de Schelde in Vlissingen. The keel laying took place on 28 April 1977 and the launching on 3 June 1978. The ship was put into service on 14 April 1981.

The ships returned to Den Helder on 19 May 1982.

In 1998 the vessel was decommissioned and was sold to the United Arab Emirates Navy.

United Arab Emirates service history
The ship was commissioned on 27 June 1998 to the United Arab Emirates Navy where the vessel was renamed Al Emirat. Al Emirat was decommissioned in 2008. Construction work started in 2009 to rebuild the ship into a yacht named .

Notes

Kortenaer-class frigates
1978 ships
Ships built in Vlissingen
Frigates of the Cold War